Water Island may refer to:

Water Island, New York, a hamlet in Suffolk County, on Fire Island
Water Island, U.S. Virgin Islands, acquired by the USA in 1917